Omerta were an indie rock band from Manchester, England.  The band were an early forerunner of later UK Top 10 Albums act Slow Readers Club. In their own right, the band achieved considerable radio airplay and radio sessions.

History 
Omerta formed in 2003 when the four members decided to try to make a name for themselves by writing music that they enjoyed playing and listening to. James, Nick, and Neil were the first members of the band, having met one another while at school, they were already good friends and had previously been in a band called Foghead. They met Aaron in 2003 and Omerta was created.

Initially, the band were practicing all the time and writing new songs while learning where their musical influences would take them. By February 2004, they were playing venues across Manchester and the North West while still writing material.

By August 2004, Omerta had recorded their first demo CD, and while playing in York, they distributed all the copies they had to the gathered crowd. Positive reviews soon followed and interest in the band became more evident with increased attendance at gigs and requests for music from record companies. Omerta continued to perform live, record and write more material for the next few months.

In February 2005, local indie label, Northern Ambition offered to release the band's first single.  April 2005 saw the release of debut Double A-side single Everyone is Frozen / Learn to Love the System on a limited 7" run and stockists were forced to restrict purchase to only one copy per customer in the interests of public order.  Stocks in Manchester and London sold out in three days. Fans who were too late bid on eBay for up to fifteen times the disc's original value.

The Everyone is Frozen single was playlisted on XFM, chosen as record of the week by Claire Sturgess and recommended by Steve Lamacq on his BBC 6 Music show. Shortly after the single release, the band recorded a session  for Sturgess' programme on XFM, thus becoming one of only three unsigned acts to date to record a live session for the station.

In early October 2005 the band released their second single "One Chance" on a limited edition of 400 T inch vinyl singles and 400 CDs. Much like the first single, "One Chance" received considerable radio airplay and press, and the entire pressing sold out in only one day. In addition the single also went in at Position 36 in the BBC Indie/Rock Official Chart Listing.

Omerta were in XFM's top 5 live sessions of 2005 (which included many signed artists) and they were Piccadilly Records' number 1 Indie Single of 2005 as well as making their list of 2005's best sellers).

In 2006 the band released a single "One More Minute" on Northern Ambition.  However, by summer 2007 the band had split, and in 2008 Starkie, Turvin and Ryan formed a new band under the name The Slow Readers Club.

Musical style
Omerta combined synths, strings, bleeps and beeps, cutting guitar, and a solid rhythm section to create music that engaged both melodically and lyrically delivered by a heart-rending vocal. Their sound drew comparisons with Radiohead, Interpol, and The Killers.

Personnel
The band consisted of: 
Aaron Starkie - lead vocals
Nick Moylan - guitar, backing vocals
James Ryan - bass guitar
Neil Turvin - drums/percussion.

Discography

Singles
 "Everyone is Frozen" / "Learn to Love the System"
 "One Chance"
 "One More Minute"

References

External links
 Omerta on Myspace Music
 Official website of The Slow Readers Club

Musical groups from Manchester
English indie rock groups